Mammoth Peak is a mountain in the area of Tuolumne Meadows, Yosemite National Park, California. The summit is a class 1-2 cross-country hike that features river crossings and boulder scrambling. The peak lies at the northern end of the Kuna Crest and is close to California State Route 120. From the road, its summit appears rounded and quite rocky. Though Mammoth Peak is not as popular as other nearby peaks, its relatively easily accessed summit affords tremendous views of Mount Gibbs, Mount Dana, and Mount Lewis.

The proximity of Mammoth Peak

All of the following are at least close to Mammoth Peak:

 Cockscomb, a mountain
 Johnson Peak, a mountain
 Kuna Crest, a ridge, consisting of Kuna Crest South and Kuna Crest North
 Kuna Peak, a mountain
 Lembert Dome, a granite dome
 Mount Dana, a mountain
 Mount Gibbs, a mountain
 Mount Lewis, a mountain

Geology of the Mammoth Peak area

Tuolumne batholith (also, the Tuolumne Intrusive Suite) dates to Late Cretaceous (~95 to ~85) Ma.

References

External links 

 Peakbagger on Mammoth Peak
 One YouTube, Kuna Crest: Mammoth Peak Saddle (Yosemite)
 Another YouTube, Mammoth Peak Yosemite National Park
 Another YouTube, Windy summit, Mammoth Peak, Yosemite National Park

Mountains of Yosemite National Park